Mahmood Ahmad Ghazi (13 September 1950 – 26 September 2010) was a Pakistani jurist and scholar of Islamic Studies, shariah and fiqh. He was a professor at the International Islamic University, Islamabad, judge at the Federal Shariat Court and Federal Minister for Religious Affairs in Pakistan. He completed his dars-e-nizami at the age of 16 and later obtained a PhD in Islamic Studies from Punjab University. He was fluent in Urdu, English, Arabic, Persian, Turkish and French. He authored numerous works in Urdu and English, and translated Persian poetry Payam-e-Mashriq of Muhammad Iqbal into Arabic.

Birth and education
Ghazi was born on 13 September 1950 in Kandhla, Uttar Pradesh. His father Muhammad Ahmad Farooqui was a disciple of Muhammad Zakariyya Kandhlawi whilst his mother was niece of Izharul Hasan Kandhlawi. Ghazi started memorizing al-Qur’ân from the madrasa of Mawlâna Siddĭq Ahmad, during stay with his (maternal) grandmother, and completed the Hifz (memorization) after migration to Karachi, Pakistan in 1954 from the madrasah of Qâri Waqa-Allah Panipati, at the age of eight years. He started Dars-i Nizami from Jamia Uloom-ul-Islamia, Karachi and completed the syllabus from Madrasa Ta‘lim al- Qur’ân, Rawalpindi in 1966. He got the degrees of B.A. Hons. (Arabic) in 1966; B.A. Hons. (Persian) in 1968; M.A. (Arabic) in 1976; and PhD in 1998 from the University of the Punjab, Lahore.

Books
Ghazi wrote about 30 books and more than 100 articles. His Muhaazraat Series have also been published as separate books. Muhaazraat Series are a collection of about 68 lectures, Ghazi had given at Idara al-Huda on different topics like Quran, Hadith, Fiqh, Seerat and Shariat. His other notable books include:

Urdu books
 Adab al-Qadi
 Musawwadah Qanun-e-Qisas wa Diyat
 Ahkam-e-Bulughat
 Islam Ka Qanun Bayn al-Mamalik
Quran Ek Ta'aruf
 Islami Shari'at awr Asr-e-Hazir
 Muhkamat-e-Alam-e-Qur'an
 Amr bil Maruf wa Nahy un al-Munkar
 Usul al-Fiqh I & II (Related to Fiqh)
 Qawa’id al-Fiqhiyyah I & II
Tafneen ash-Shar'iah

English books
Notable English works of Ghazi are:
 The Hijrah: Its Philosophy and Message for the Modern Man
 Qadianism
 The Life and Work of the Prophet of Islam (The book has been translated from the marvelous French work of Dr. Muhammad Hamidullah). 
 Renaissance and Revivalism in Muslim India ― 1707-1867
 The Shorter book on Muslim International Law (Translation of al-Siyar al-Saghir of Muhammad al-Shaybani)
 An Analytical Study of the Sannusiyyah Movement of North Africa
 Islamic Renaissance in South Asia (1707-1867)―The Role of Shah Waliullah and His Successors
 State and Legislation in Islam

Death
Mehmood Ahmad Ghazi died on 26 September 2010.

References

External links
 http://www.mahmoodghazi.org/ - Official website dedicated to the life, achievements and works of Dr. Mahmood Ahmad Ghazi.

20th-century Muslim scholars of Islam
Muhajir people
Pakistani Arabists
Pakistani Sunni Muslim scholars of Islam
Pakistani judges
2010 deaths
1950 births
Academic staff of the International Islamic University, Islamabad
University of the Punjab alumni
Jamia Uloom-ul-Islamia alumni
Deobandis